Strobilurus esculentus is a very common, edible mushroom of the genus Strobilurus. It can often be found in the spring on and around fallen spruce cones.

Description

The cap is convex, brownish grey, and grows 1 to 3 cm in diameter. It can also be off-white or brownish-black. The gills are crowded, white, and somewhat sinuate. The spores are white. The stem is brownish grey with a pale apex.

References
E. Garnweidner. Mushrooms and Toadstools of Britain and Europe. Collins. 1994.

External links
 
 

Physalacriaceae
Fungi described in 1782
Fungi of Europe